Marie François may refer to:

 Auguste Marie François Beernaert (1829–1912), Prime Minister of Belgium
 Marie François Oscar Bardy de Fourtou (1836–1897), French politician
 Marie François Sadi Carnot (1837–1894), French statesman
 Marie François Xavier Bichat (1771–1802), French anatomist and physiologist
 Marie François (handballer) (born 1993), French handballer
 Marie-François Auguste de Caffarelli du Falga (1766-1849), French general

See also
 François Marie (disambiguation)